The  was a limited express train service in Japan operated by the East Japan Railway Company (JR East) between Ueno in Tokyo and Minakami in Gunma Prefecture.

History
The Minakami service (written in hiragana as "みなかみ") began as a semi-express service between Ueno and Minakami from 1 October 1964. This operated until 30 September 1965, after which the train was renamed Okutone.

The name was revived from 1 October 1997 (this time written in kanji as "水上") following the renaming of the former Tanigawa limited express service.

From the start of the revised timetable on 4 December 2010, the Minakami will cease to be a regular service, operating only during busy seasons.

Rolling stock
Services are formed of 7-car 651 series EMU formations, sometimes coupled with Akagi services.

References

External links

 JR East 185 series Akagi/Kusatsu/Minakami 

Named passenger trains of Japan
East Japan Railway Company
Railway services introduced in 1964
1964 establishments in Japan